Cathedral Heights is a small, affluent residential neighborhood located in the upper Northwest quadrant of Washington, D.C.  It is approximately bounded by Woodley Road to the north, Fulton Street to the south, Wisconsin Avenue to the east, and Glover Archbold Park and Idaho Avenue to the west.

Geography

Cathedral Heights is bordered by the neighborhoods of Tenleytown to the north, Cleveland Park to the northeast, Woodley Park to the east, American University Park to the west, and Glover Park to the south.

Architecture

Cathedral Heights is a quiet neighborhood in the shadow of the historic Washington National Cathedral, composed primarily of single-family detached houses and Edwardian row houses, although the Wisconsin Avenue and Cathedral Avenue corridors of Cathedral Heights are lined with apartment buildings, condominiums, and cooperative complexes.

Media
In Season 2, Episode 1 of House of Cards, U.S. Rep. Frank Underwood (D-S.C.) meets with reporter Zoe Barnes at the fictitious Cathedral Heights Metro station. The actual scene was filmed at the Charles Center subway stop in Baltimore, Maryland, where much of the filming for House of Cards was done.

References

External links

 ANC3B, Cathedral Height's Advisory Neighborhood Commission
 Move to Cathedral Highlands: An Unobstructed View of the Entire Surrounding Country

Neighborhoods in Northwest (Washington, D.C.)
Washington National Cathedral